The Buholmråsa Lighthouse is a coastal lighthouse in the municipality of Osen in Trøndelag county, Norway. It was built in 1917 and automated in 1994. During World War II, air raids damaged some of the buildings at this station.

The 140,400-candela light emits a white, red, or green light (depending on direction), occulting once every six seconds. The lighthouse also broadcasts a racon signal that is a morse code letter B (-•••).

See also

Lighthouses in Norway
List of lighthouses in Norway

References

External links
 Norsk Fyrhistorisk Forening 

Lighthouses completed in 1917
Osen
Lighthouses in Trøndelag